Riesel Sieve was a volunteer computing project, running in part on the BOINC platform. Its aim was to prove that 509,203 is the smallest Riesel number, by finding a prime of the form  for all odd  smaller than 509,203.

Progress
At the start of the project in August 2003, there were  less than 509,203 for which no prime  was known. , 52 of these  had been eliminated by Riesel Sieve or outside persons; the largest prime found by this project is 502,573 × 27,181,987 − 1 of 2,162,000 digits, and it is known that for none of the remaining  there is a prime with n <= 10,000,000 (As of February 2020).

The project proceeds in the same way as other prime-hunting projects like GIMPS or Seventeen or Bust: sieving eliminates pairs (k, n) with small factors, and then a deterministic test, in this case the Lucas-Lehmer-Riesel test based on the Lucas-Lehmer test, is used to check primality of numbers without small factors.  Users can choose whether to sieve or to run LLR tests on candidates sieved by other users; heavily-optimised sieving software is available.

Riesel Sieve maintains lists of the primes that have been found and the k whose status is still unknown.

From 2010, the investigation has been merged with another BOINC project, PrimeGrid as a sub-project.

References

External links
The official Riesel Sieve home page (Riesel Sieve is now part of PrimeGrid)
PrimeGrid: About the Riesel Problem (introductory forum post), The Riesel Problem statistics (status page), Primes, TRP (search result)
Definition and status of the problem

Science in society
Free science software
Volunteer computing projects
Experimental mathematics